KH Fakhruddin (born Muhammad Jazuli, 1890–28 February 1929) was an Indonesian Islamic leader. He is regarded as a National Hero of Indonesia. He initiated the Badan Penolong Haji (Hajj Helper Agency) to help Indonesians who are conducting hajj in Mecca.

References

National Heroes of Indonesia
1890 births
1929 deaths